Vlădeşti may refer to:

Vlădești, Argeș, a commune in Argeș County, Romania
Vlădești, Galați, a commune in Galați County, Romania
Vlădești, Vâlcea, a commune in Vâlcea County, Romania
Vlădeşti, a village in Râmeț Commune, Alba County, Romania
Vlădeşti, a village in Tigveni Commune, Argeș County, Romania
Vlădeşti, a village in Bogdăneşti Commune, Vaslui County, Romania

See also
Vlădescu